The 1928 Oklahoma A&M Cowboys football team represented Oklahoma A&M College in the 1928 college football season. This was the 28th year of football at A&M and the eighth under John Maulbetsch. The Cowboys played their home games at Lewis Field in Stillwater, Oklahoma. They finished the season 1–7–0, 0–1–0 in the Missouri Valley Conference.

Schedule

References

Oklahoma AandM
Oklahoma State Cowboys football seasons
Oklahoma AandM